Pirkənd or Pirkend may refer to:
Pirkənd, Agdash, Azerbaijan
Pirkənd, Ujar, Azerbaijan